Alfred E. Bull (February 5, 1867 – January 20, 1930) was an American football player, coach, rower, and dentist. He played football at the University of Pennsylvania and was selected as a center to the 1895 College Football All-America Team. Bull later served as the head football coach at the University of Iowa (1896), Franklin & Marshall College (1896–1897), Georgetown University (1900), Lafayette College (1903–1907), and Muhlenberg College (1908–1910), compiling a career college football coaching record of 62–34–15.

College playing career
Bull attended the University of Pennsylvania, from which he graduated with a degree in dentistry. He played football for the Penn Quakers and was named to the All-American team in 1895. During a game between Penn and the Carlisle Indian Industrial School, Bull faced off against All-American and early professional footballer Bemus Pierce. Bull and Pierce faced each other on the line throughout the game, and on a play late in the game Pierce knocked Bull to the ground, and the play went over him. After the play, Pierce, who was a Native American, cried out to the Penn players, "Look, look at Sitting Bull." Bull also rowed for the Penn crew.

Coaching and professional playing career
After graduating from Penn, Bull served as head football coach at Iowa, Franklin & Marshall, Georgetown, Lafayette, and Muhlenberg, compiling a record of 62–34–15 in a career that lasted from 1896 to 1910. Bull's 1896 Iowa team won the first conference title in school history. Bull played quarterback and served as the coach for the Latrobe Athletic Association in 1898. The 1898 team started off to a 7–0 record, before losing three games to Pittsburgh Athletic Club, Duquesne Country and Athletic Club and the Greensburg Athletic Association to finish 7–3.

Later life
Bull spent the last 30 years of his life, from 1900 to 1930, practicing dentistry in Wilkes-Barre, Pennsylvania.

Head coaching record

College

References

1867 births
1930 deaths
19th-century players of American football
American dentists
American football centers
American football quarterbacks
Franklin & Marshall Diplomats football coaches
Georgetown Hoyas football coaches
Iowa Hawkeyes football coaches
Lafayette Leopards football coaches
Latrobe Athletic Association coaches
Latrobe Athletic Association players
Muhlenberg Mules football coaches
Penn Quakers football coaches
Penn Quakers football players
Penn Quakers rowers
All-American college football players
University of Pennsylvania School of Dental Medicine alumni
Sportspeople from Wilkes-Barre, Pennsylvania
Coaches of American football from Pennsylvania
Players of American football from Pennsylvania